The 2017 BDO World Trophy was a major darts tournament run by the British Darts Organisation. It was hosted between 26–29 May 2017 at Memo Arts Centre, Barry, Wales. The event was broadcast on FrontRunner.

Australian qualifier Peter Machin won the men's title, and Dutch player Aileen de Graaf won the women's title.

Men

Qualifiers

Top 16 in BDO Rankings
  Glen Durrant 
  Mark McGeeney
  Jamie Hughes
  Scott Mitchell
  Dean Reynolds
  Danny Noppert
  Darryl Fitton
  Wesley Harms
  Scott Waites
  Darius Labanauskas
  Ross Montgomery
  Martin Adams  
  Geert De Vos 
  Nick Kenny 
  Martin Phillips
  Richard Veenstra

17–22 in BDO Rankings

WDF regional Qualifiers
 Yuya Higuchi 
 Peter Machin
 Dennis Nilsson
 Cameron Menzies
 Umit Uygunsozlu
 Joe Chaney
 Willem Mandigers

Play-Offs Qualifiers
 Martin Atkins 
 Carl Dennell
 Jeff Smith

Regional Qualifiers Greg Moss and David Cameron, originally qualified for this event, but had to withdraw before the start of the tournament. They were replaced by the next two-highest non-qualified player in BDO Rankings; James Hurrell and Conan Whitehead.

Draw

Women

Qualifiers

Draw

References

BDO World Trophy
BDO World Trophy
BDO World Trophy
Barry, Vale of Glamorgan
BDO World Trophy